John Wilkerson Kendall (June 26, 1834 – March 7, 1892) was an American lawyer who served for one year as a U.S. Representative from Kentucky from March 4, 1891 until his death on March 7, 1892.

He was the father of Joseph Morgan Kendall.

Biography 
Born in Morgan County, Kentucky, Kendall attended the common schools and Owingsville Academy, where he studied law.
He was admitted to the bar in 1854 and commenced practice in West Liberty, Kentucky. He served as prosecuting attorney of Morgan County 1854–1858.

Civil War 
During the Civil War Kendall served as first lieutenant and adjutant of the Tenth Kentucky Confederate Cavalry.

Political career 
He then served as a member of the State House of Representatives from 1867 to 1871. Afterwards, he became the Commonwealth attorney for the 13th judicial district from 1872 to 1878.

Kendall was elected as a Democrat to the Fifty-second Congress and served from March 4, 1891, until his death in Washington, D.C., on March 7, 1892.

Death 
He was interred in Barber Cemetery, West Liberty, Kentucky.

See also
List of United States Congress members who died in office (1790–1899)

References

1834 births
1892 deaths
Confederate States Army officers
Democratic Party members of the Kentucky House of Representatives
Democratic Party members of the United States House of Representatives from Kentucky
People from Morgan County, Kentucky
People from West Liberty, Kentucky
People of Kentucky in the American Civil War
19th-century American politicians